Daily at Dawn was an Australian sitcom that screened in 1981 on the Seven Network. The series was written and produced by Gary Reilly and Tony Sattler, the team behind other popular Australian comedy series such as Kingswood Country, Hey Dad..! and The Naked Vicar Show.

Synopsis 
The series was set in the office of a metropolitan newspaper.

It was the first Australian comedy series to feature a regular gay character (Terry Bader as journalist Leslie).

Cast
 Noeline Brown as Phil Maguire
 Paul Chubb as Russell Ducke
 Terry Bader as Leslie Windrush
 Henri Szeps as Joe Parker
 Julieanne Newbould as Kate Ashton
 Robert Hughes as Gil James
 Theo Stephens as Danny Mason

References

External links
 

Australian television sitcoms
Seven Network original programming
Australian television spin-offs
1981 Australian television series debuts
1981 Australian television series endings